Frogmore is a private estate in Windsor Great Park in Berkshire, England.

Frogmore may also refer to:


Places

Australia
 Frogmore, New South Wales

Canada
 Frogmore, Ontario

United Kingdom
Frogmore House, on the Frogmore Estate in Berkshire
Royal Burial Ground, Frogmore
 Frogmore, Cornwall
 Frogmore, Devon
 Frogmore, Hampshire
 Frogmore, Hertfordshire
 Frogmore, Wiltshire, an area of Westbury

United States
 Frogmore, Concordia Parish, Louisiana, unincorporated community
 Frogmore, Pointe Coupee Parish, Louisiana, unincorporated community
 Frogmore, South Carolina, unincorporated community
 Frogmore (Ferriday, Louisiana), historic plantation in Concordia Parish, Louisiana
 Frogmore Mound Site, archaeological site 
 Frogmore (Edisto Island, South Carolina), plantation house in Charleston County, South Carolina
 Frogmore Plantation Complex in Beaufort County, South Carolina

Other uses 
 The Frogmore Papers, British literary journal published by the Frogmore Press
 Frogmore Community College, a community secondary school in Yateley, Hampshire